Franklin King (born March 3, 1957) is a Canadian football player who played professionally for the BC Lions, Calgary Stampeders, Toronto Argonauts and Hamilton Tiger-Cats.

References

1957 births
Living people
Sportspeople from Pocatello, Idaho
Players of American football from Idaho
Kansas Jayhawks football players
BC Lions players
Calgary Stampeders players
Toronto Argonauts players
Hamilton Tiger-Cats players
Canadian football defensive backs